Kunwar Ram  is an Indian politician. He was elected to the lower House of the Indian Parliament the Lok Sabha from Nawada, Bihar as a member of the Indian National Congress.

References

External links
Official biographical sketch in Parliament of India website

Indian National Congress politicians
India MPs 1980–1984
India MPs 1984–1989
Lok Sabha members from Bihar
Possibly living people